Iya Yanivna Kiva (another spelling - Ija Kiva) (born May 4, 1984) is a Ukrainian poet, translator, journalist, and critic. She is the author of the books, Подальше от рая (Further from Heaven), Перша сторінка зими (The First Page of Winter), and Ми прокинемось іншими: розмови з сучасними білоруськими письменниками про минуле, теперішнє і майбутнє Білорусі (We Will Wake Up to Others: Conversations with Contemporary Belarusian Writers on the Past, Present and Future of Belarus). She is a member of PEN Ukraine. Kiva writes in Ukrainian and Russian.

Early life and education
Iya Yanivna Kiva was born on May 4, 1984, in the city of Donetsk. She graduated from the Faculty of Philology of Donetsk National University, majoring in Russian Language, Literature, and Culturology. She also studied graphic design. Due to the Russo-Ukrainian war, in the summer of 2014, she moved to Kyiv.

Career
Kiva began writing in Ukrainian at the beginning of the war. These included poems, translations and reviews, published in domestic and foreign periodicals, as well as in anthologies such as, Антологія молодої української поезії III тисячоліття (Anthology of young Ukrainian poetry of the third millennium). She is the author of the poetry collections Подальше от рая (Further from Heaven; 2018) and Перша сторінка зими (The First Page of Winter; 2019). Her poems have been translated into several languages, including English, and her essays have been translated into German.

She is the winner of a number of international and Ukrainian festivals and competitions, including the International Poetry Festival "Emigrant Lyre" (2016) and the International Poetry Competition "Gaivoronnya" (2019). Kiva is a laureate of the award named after Yuri Kaplan (2013), the literary competition of the Smoloskyp publishing house (2018, 4th prize), the Metaphora translation prize (2018), and others. She is the winner of the II Poetry Tournament and the Nestor the Chronicler Prize (2019), as well as Metaphora Translation Prize (2020).

The book Подальше от рая (Further from Heaven) was included in the list of the best books of 2018 according to PEN Ukraine. The poetry collection, Перша сторінка зими (The First Page of Winter), received a special award from the jury of the "ЛітАкцент-2019" (LitAccent-2019) award, and was included in the list of the best books of 2019 according to PEN Ukraine. The book, Ми прокинемось іншими (We will wake up to others), was included in the list of important non-fiction books according to The Village Ukraine, and the list of the best books of 2021 according to the Ukrainian PEN.

She has participated in poetry events, as well as national and international festivals in Ukraine, Belarus, Poland, Belgium and Finland. She is a scholar of the program of the Minister of Culture of Poland Gaude Polonia (2021), and participant in the literary residence "Гніздо" (The Nest Residency) in the village of Vytachiv, Kyiv Oblast (2022). As a translator, Kiva participated in international translation seminars "Cities of translators digital", a draft program of the German Translation Foundation "TOLEDO" with the support of the German Ministry of Foreign Affairs (online, 2020) and "Tłumacze bez granic" (Translators without Borders; 2021, Wojnowice, Poland).

Selected works

Poetry
 Further from Heaven, 2018 (Russian and Ukrainian)
 The First Page of Winter, 2019
 A witness to namelessness, 2022 (Bulgarian: translated by Denis Olegov)
 Black roses of time, 2022 (Polish: translated by Aneta Kaminska)

Anthologies
 Breed. Anthology of Ukrainian writers of Donbass, 2017
 Ukrainian Nadzieja. Anthology of poetry, 2017
 Anthology of young Ukrainian poetry of the third millennium, 2018
 Poetic subway, 2020
 Anthology of young Ukrainian poetry "ROMAN. K 30+ ", 2021
 Reading of the young city, 2021
 Invasion: Ukrainian Poems about the War. /Trans. from Ukrainian by Anatoly Kudryavitsky. - Dublin, Ireland: Survision Books. - 2022.
 Under Ukrainas öppna himmel. Röster ur ett krig: En litterär antologi./Red. Mikael Nydahl, Kholod Saghir. — Linderöd: Ariel förlag; Svenska PEN, 2022. — 288 sidor (in Swedish translations)

Translations
 Elizabeth Suneby and Laurel Molk, No Room for a Pup!, 2022
 Rita Golden Gelman, Queen Esther Saves Her People, 2021
 Blessed Benjamin in translations, 2021
 Blessed Benjamin. The light of travel and separation. 2021 (co-translator with Yulia Sheket and Natalia Belchenko)
 Dmitry Strotsev, Belarus overturned, 2021
 Yael Molchadsky, Shopkeeper and baker, 2021
 Pamela Mayer, Don't Sneeze at the Wedding, 2020
 Eric A. Kimmel, Gershon's Monster, 2020
 Gloria Koster, Ruthie is Little Red Riding Hood, 2019
 Lesik Panasyuk, Screams of hands. Poems., 2018
 Maria Galina, Indigenous, 2016

Journalism
 We will wake up to others: conversations with contemporary Belarusian writers about the past, present and future of Belarus, 2021

Essays
 What will give us strength? Essays of Ukrainian intellectuals on the focus of the Ukrainian PEN 2019/2020, 2021

References

1984 births
Living people
Writers from Donetsk
Ukrainian writers in Russian
Donetsk National University alumni
21st-century Ukrainian writers
21st-century Ukrainian poets
21st-century Ukrainian journalists
Ukrainian essayists
Ukrainian women poets
Ukrainian women journalists
Ukrainian literary critics
Women literary critics